Azerbaijan Time, abbreviated as AZT, is the standard time zone in Azerbaijan, four hours ahead of UTC (UTC+04:00). The daylight saving time adjustment, Azerbaijan Summer Time (AZST), was one hour ahead at UTC+05:00 and was introduced in 1997 and discontinued in March 2016.

Azerbaijan Time is the same as Samara Time (Russia), United Arab Emirates Standard Time, Georgia Time, Armenia Time and Seychelles Time.

IANA time zone database
The IANA time zone database contains one zone for Azerbaijan in the file zone.tab, named Asia/Baku.

References

Time in Azerbaijan